Aníbal Panceyra Garrido (born 23 October 1988) is an Argentine rugby union player, currently playing for Súper Liga Americana de Rugby side Cafeteros Pro. His preferred position is lock, flanker or number 8.

Professional career
Panceyra Garrido signed for Súper Liga Americana de Rugby side Cafeteros Pro ahead of the 2021 Súper Liga Americana de Rugby season. He had previously represented the Argentina Sevens side at 11 competitions between 2012 and 2014, including at the 2013 Rugby World Cup Sevens. He also represented  and the Argentina XV.

References

External links
itsrugby.co.uk Profile

1988 births
Living people
Argentine rugby union players
Rugby union locks
Rugby union flankers
Rugby union number eights
Cafeteros Pro players
Pampas XV players